Gito, l'ingrat ("Gito the Ingrate") is a 1992 Burundian comedy film directed by Léonce Ngabo.

Synopsis
Gito is a Burundian student who lives in Paris. When he finishes his studies, he decides to go back to his country and promises his French girlfriend that he will call her when he becomes a minister, something that he is convinced that will happen. However, he loses gradually his ambition as he is confronted with the country reality. He thus starts going out again with his childhood loved one. Nevertheless, he will make the best of a bad deal, with the help of the two women of his life.

Festivals
 Amakula Kampala International Film Festival, Uganda (1992)
 Jameson Dublin International Film Festival, Ireland (1992)
 London Film Festival, England

Awards
 Oumarou Ganda Prize and Best Actor at FESPACO - Panafrican Film and Television Festival of Ouagadougou, Burkina Faso (1993)
 Air Afrique Prize at African Film Festival, Italy (1993)
 Best film - Jury's prize at Lisboa Film Festival, Portugal (1993)
 Émile Cantillon Prize at Festival International du Film Francophone, Belgium (1992)
 Prix de la Ville d'Amiens do Amiens International Film Festival, France (1992)
 Hani Jahvaria and Press Prizes at Carthage Film Festival, Tunis (1992)

References

Bibliography
 Russel, Sharon A., Guide to African Cinema, 1998, pp. 68–70

External links
Gito, l'ingrat - IMDb page about Gito, l'ingrat
Article in Africultures

Burundian comedy films
Films set in Burundi
Films shot in Burundi
1992 films
1992 comedy films